Bakhresa Sugar Limited, whose official name is Bagamoyo Sugar Limited (BSL), is a sugar manufacturer in Tanzania, the second-largest economy in the East African Community.

Location
The plantation and planned factory of BSL are located in Bagamoyo District, in the Pwani Region of Tanzania, along the Indian Ocean coast.

Overview
Bakhresa Sugar Limited is a privately owned sugar manufacturer. It is owned by the Bakhresa Group, an industrial conglomerate, with interests in plastics, agribusiness, baked goods, soft beverages, mineral water, hospitality, transportation and warehousing. The project is being developed in phases, with completion expected in five to ten years.

 Phase I
This phase started in December 2017 with the commencement of planting sugarcane seedlings. This will be followed by the construction of the crushing machinery. It is expected that this phase will cost TSh:167.3 billion (US$72 million) and conclude in 2020. 

 Phase II
The second phase will involve the expansion of the sugar plantations to at least . 

 Phase III
The timing of the third phase will depend on the outcomes of Phase I and Phase II. 

In addition to building the sugar factory, grid electricity will need to be extended to the site, a road network has to built and an irrigation system installed. Total development cost is estimated at TSh:669 billion (US$289 million). Initial annual production is expected to be 30,000 metric tonnes, but production is scalable to 100,000 metric tonnes.

See also
 Economy of Tanzania
 List of sugar manufacturers in Tanzania

References

External links
 About the Bakhresa Group

Sugar companies of Tanzania
Agriculture companies established in 2016
2016 establishments in Tanzania